Friday Island may refer to:

Islands
Friday Island, New Zealand
Friday Island (Queensland)
Friday Island, River Thames

Other
Friday Island (TV series), a 1962–1963 Canadian comedy-drama television series which aired on CBC